Sons of Thunder is the second album of the Christian metalcore band, Sleeping Giant. It is the first album to officially feature Guitarist Eric Gregson and Bassist J.R. Bermuda.

Track listing

Credits
Sleeping Giant
 J.R. Bermuda - Bass
 Travis Boyd - Drums
 Geoff Brouillette - Guitar
 Tommy Green - Vocals
 Eric Gregson - Guitar
Additional Musicians
 Ryan Clark - Guest Vocals on track 6
 Dawn Johnson - Choir/Chorus, Management, Performer
 Joe Marchiano - Choir/Chorus
 Chris Ryan - Choir/Chorus
 George Bowker - Piano
Production
 Charles Bybee - Audio Engineer, Audio Production, Engineer, Producer
 Darian Cowgill - Mixing
 Troy Glessner - Engineer, Mastering
 Beth Jahnsen - Management
 Dave Quiggle - Cover Art

References

Sleeping Giant (band) albums
2009 albums
Facedown Records albums